WOTH-CD, virtual and UHF digital channel 20, was a low-powered, Class A television station licensed to Cincinnati, Ohio, United States. Owned by Elliott B. Block's Block Broadcasting, it was a sister station to WBQC-LD (channel 25). WOTH's transmitter was located along Symmes Street, just south of East McMillan Street in Cincinnati (shared with ABC affiliate WCPO-TV, channel 9).

History

WOTH was previously branded as "The Other Channel." It began on June 7, 1994 as W35BA, channel 35, broadcasting programming from America's Store that had previously aired on WBQC. It soon moved to channel 39, becoming W39CG. In 2001, the station became WOTH-LP and moved to channel 38. WOTH adopted a simplified version of WBQC's old "25 TV" logo.

In the Federal Communications Commission (FCC)'s incentive auction, WOTH-CD sold its spectrum for $13,266,948; at the time, the station indicated that it would enter into a post-auction channel sharing agreement. On-screen messages later announced that WOTH would go off the air permanently on January 23, 2018.

Shutdown
WOTH went off the air permanently on January 23, 2018, at 5:03 p.m. The station posted a photo on Facebook depicting its transmitter being turned off. According to WOTH's Facebook page, WOTH would move some, but not all, of its subchannels to its sister station WBQC-LD (branded as WKRP-TV). Subchannels already moved at the time WOTH was shut down were HSN and Evine. Elliot Block, the station owner, stated that within two weeks of WOTH's closing, Decades, Movies! and Heroes & Icons would also be moved to WBQC-LD.

The station's license was cancelled by the FCC on February 19, 2018.

Digital television
The station's digital signal was multiplexed on Channel 20.

Programming
WBQC aired network programming except for four hours per week of locally produced programs:

 Heart of Compassion
 Inform Cincinnati

References

External links
 – former WOTH-LP website

OTH-CD
Television channels and stations established in 1988
Television channels and stations disestablished in 2018
1988 establishments in Ohio
2018 disestablishments in Ohio
Defunct television stations in the United States
Low-power television stations in the United States
OTH-CD